Huby is a village and civil parish in the Hambleton District of North Yorkshire, England, about nine and a half miles north of York and five miles south-east of Easingwold. The village has a small shop, post office, fish and chip shop, a Chinese takeaway, a pub, motel rooms, a Methodist church, a sports ground complete with a pavilion, a B&B motel and a village hall.

Governance
Huby is the largest village in the electoral ward of Huby and Sutton. The population of this ward at the 2011 census was 1,940.

References

External links

 Huby village website - general information on the village

Villages in North Yorkshire
Civil parishes in North Yorkshire